Rune Hauge (born 23 April 1954) is a Norwegian football agent. Hauge represented John Jensen and Pål Lydersen during their transfers to Arsenal in the early 1990s. This would lead to Arsenal manager George Graham becoming embroiled in allegations that Hauge paid him a £425,000 "bung" to sign the players. Graham was later found guilty by the Football Association after admitting receiving an "unsolicited gift" and was suspended for a year. Before this, Hauge was involved in the signings of Andrei Kanchelskis and Peter Schmeichel for Manchester United.

Hauge was banned from operating as an agent for life by FIFA in 1995, but this was later reduced to two years' suspension of his licence. After he regained his licence, he went on to represent several Norwegian players including Ole Gunnar Solskjær, Steffen Iversen and Eirik Bakke. He was also involved in the transfer of Rio Ferdinand from West Ham United to Leeds United.

In 2005, he was involved in the transfer dispute between Manchester United and Chelsea over Mikel John Obi, claiming (along with others) that he had the right to represent Mikel.

Hauge's current clients include Norwegian midfielder Morten Gamst Pedersen.

References

External links
 Three Cups and a Brown Paper Bag - account of the Graham scandal
 The Very Strange Transfer Saga of John Obi Mikel
 
 

1954 births
Living people
Association football agents
Norwegian sports agents
Norwegian contract bridge players